The Mantoverde mine is a large copper mine located in northern Chile in the Atacama Region. Mantoverde represents one of the largest copper reserves in Chile and in the world having estimated reserves of 580 million tonnes of ore grading 0.5% copper. In February 2020, Mitsubishi Materials Corp stated that it bought a stake worth 30% in the company for $236 million.

See also 
List of mines in Chile
Mining in Chile

References 

Copper mines in Chile
Mines in Atacama Region
Surface mines in Chile